The Grand Prix Stan Ockers was a professional cycle race held as a single-day race around Valentigney, France, held in memoriam of Stan Ockers. It was first held in 1957 and held for the final time in 1963. From 1959 to 1963 it was part of the Super Prestige Pernod series.

Winners

References

Men's road bicycle races
Cycle races in France
Defunct cycling races in France
Super Prestige Pernod races
Recurring sporting events established in 1957
1957 establishments in France
Recurring sporting events disestablished in 1963
1963 disestablishments in France